Sofka Zinovieff (born 1961) is a British author and journalist.

Early life

Zinovieff was born in London. Her parents were Peter Zinovieff and Victoria Gala Heber-Percy. Her paternal grandparents were White Russians who had left Soviet Russia for the United Kingdom shortly after the October Revolution. Zinovieff would later write a biography of her grandmother, Sofka Skipwith. Her maternal grandfather was the noted eccentric aristocrat Robert Heber-Percy, whose property, including the Faringdon House estate in Oxfordshire, she inherited at the age of 25; through him she is a descendant of Algernon Percy, 1st Earl of Beverley, of the family of the Dukes of Northumberland.

She grew up in Putney in south-west London, where her father was founder of Britain's first synthesizer manufacturer, Electronic Music Studios (London) Ltd. She studied social anthropology at Cambridge University. Later she gained a PhD after living and carrying out research in the Peloponnese.

Career

Zinovieff has worked as a journalist and book reviewer for various British publications. She has written several books, from memoirs and biographies to novels.

Works
Eurydice Street: A Place in Athens (Granta, 2004).   
Red Princess: A Revolutionary Life (Granta, 2007).   
The House on Paradise Street (Short Books, 2012). 
The Mad Boy, Lord Berners, My Grandmother and Me (Jonathan Cape, 2014). 
Putney (Bloomsbury Publishing, 2018)

Personal life

Sofka Zinovieff has lived and worked in Russia, Italy, and, for many years, in Greece. She and her Greek husband Vassilis Papadimitriou live between Athens and London. They have two daughters.

References

External links
 Official website

Living people
1961 births
British journalists
British writers
English people of Russian descent